Isabel Mozún (born 26 March 1960) is a Spanish athlete. She competed in the women's high jump at the 1984 Summer Olympics.

References

1960 births
Living people
Athletes (track and field) at the 1984 Summer Olympics
Spanish female high jumpers
Olympic athletes of Spain
Place of birth missing (living people)